Cas3 is an ATP-dependent single-strand DNA (ssDNA) translocase/helicase enzyme that degrades DNA as part of CRISPR based immunity.

Cas3 is a "signature" protein of class 1 CRISPR systems and functions in a complex known as CASCADE, with other cas genes and a targeting RNA to degrade viral DNA. 

In April 2019 Cornell University researcher Ailong Ke published a paper in the journal Molecular Cell describing a new gene editing CRISPR system, CRISPR-Cas3 which can efficiently delete long swaths of DNA from a targeted site in the human genome. This ability is superior to that achieved with the more common CRISPR-Cas9 systems.

CONAN, a CRISPR based diagnostic approach was developed utilising Cas3

References 

Enzymes
Immune system
Prokaryote genes